Caletas-Ario Mixed Wildlife Refuge, is a protected area in Costa Rica, managed under the Tempisque Conservation Area, it was created in 2006 by decree 33232-MINAE.

References 

Nature reserves in Costa Rica
Protected areas established in 2006